Noviglio is a comune in the Province of Milan in the Italian region Lombardy, located about  southwest of Milan.

Noviglio borders the following municipalities: Gaggiano, Zibido San Giacomo, Rosate, Rosate, Vernate, Vernate, Binasco.

Demographic evolution

References

External links
 www.comunedinoviglio.it/

Cities and towns in Lombardy